is a former Japanese football player. he is the current assistant manager J1 League club of  Yokohama FC.

Playing career
Ono was born in Yokohama on August 12, 1979. After graduating from high school, he joined J1 League club Bellmare Hiratsuka (later Shonan Bellmare) in 1998. He debuted in 1998 and he played many matches as midfielder in 1999. However the club was relegated to J2 League from 2000. He could not play at all in the match in 2000 and left the club end of 2000 season. After 1 year blank, he joined his local club Yokohama FC. He also played as side back not only midfielder. The club won the champions in 2006 J2 League and was promoted to J1 from 2007. However his opportunity to play decreased and the club was relegated to J2 in a year. He retired end of 2010 season.

Club statistics

References

External links

1979 births
Living people
Association football people from Kanagawa Prefecture
Japanese footballers
J1 League players
J2 League players
Shonan Bellmare players
Yokohama FC players
Association football midfielders